People's Army/Armed Forces is/was the title of the armed forces or army of several countries:

 Albanian People's Army
 Algerian People's National Armed Forces
 Bulgarian People's Army
 Czechoslovak People's Army
 Hungarian People's Army
 Korean People's Army, North Korea
 Lao People's Armed Forces
 Mongolian People's Army
 National People's Army of East Germany
 People's Army of Catalonia 
 People's Army of Poland
 People's Army of the Republic of Spain
 People's Army of Vietnam 
 People's Liberation Army of China
 Romanian People's Army
 South Sudan People's Defence Forces
 Ukrainian People's Army
 Yugoslav People's Army 

It is or was also the title used by various militias and rebel groups:

 Catalan People's Army – A Catalan nationalist paramilitary group during the 1970s.
 People's Army Against the Japanese – A socialist guerilla movement that fought against the Empire of Japan during World War II. 
 New People's Army – a Maoist insurgent group in the Philippines.
 People's Army of Burma – armed wing of the Communist Party of Burma
 People's Army of Komuch – officially the People's Army of the Committee of Members of the Constituent Assembly (Russian: Народная армия КОМУЧа) - an anti-Bolshevik army during the Russian Civil War, which fought at June–September 1918 in Volga Region.
 People's Army for the Restoration of Democracy (CAR) – a rebel group operating in the northwest Central African Republic 
 People's Army for the Restoration of the Republic and Democracy – another rebel group operating in the northwest Central African Republic
 People's Volunteer Army – an armed force deployed by the People's Republic of China during the Korean War.
 Uganda People's Army – a rebel group that opposed the government of Yoweri Museveni.
 Volkssturm (People's Storm) – the German national militia of the last months of World War II.

The People's Army Model refers to a school of thought concerning the role of the Israel Defense Forces in Israeli society.

See also
People's Liberation Army (disambiguation)
People's Revolutionary Army (disambiguation)